Villiers is an aristocratic family in the United Kingdom. Over time, various members of the Villiers family were made knights, baronets, and peers. Peerages held by the Villiers family include the dukedoms of Buckingham (1623–1687) and Cleveland (1670–1709), as well as the earldoms of Anglesey (1623–1661), Jersey (since 1697), and Clarendon (since 1776). Perhaps the most prominent members of the family were those who received the two dukedoms: George Villiers, 1st Duke of Buckingham (1592–1628) rose to fame and influence as favourite of King James I of England, while Barbara Villiers, Duchess of Cleveland (1640–1709) became a mistress of King Charles II of England, by whom she had five children.

History

Descent
The Villiers family was settled at Brooksby, Leicestershire, from at least 1235. In the early 13th century, the tenant of Brooksby, Gilbert de Seis, married a member of the Villiers family, a line of minor gentry of Norman descent. The estate remained in Villiers hands for the next 500 years. At this time Brooksby consisted of the hall, the nearby Church of St Michael and All Angels, Brooksby, a small number of peasants' houses and a field system with common land.

In the 16th century, the family was represented by George Villiers († 1606), a minor gentleman who is said to have been a "prosperous sheep farmer". He was High Sheriff of Leicestershire in 1591, and a Knight of the shire for the county from 1604 until his death. He was knighted in 1593.

Sir George Villiers was married twice, and left nine surviving children. Among the children from his first marriage were the eldest son, Sir William Villiers, 1st Baronet († 1629), who became the ancestor of the Villiers baronets; Edward († 1626), who became Master of the Mint and President of Munster; a daughter who married into the Boteler family; and another who married into the Washington family. Among the children from Sir George Villiers' second marriage to Mary (née Beaumont, † 1632) were George († 1628), the favourite of King James I of England who was eventually created Duke of Buckingham, and his sister Susan († 1652), who married the 1st Earl of Denbigh. According to Thomson, Sir George Villiers is an ancestor of sixteen British prime ministers, from the 3rd Duke of Grafton to David Cameron.

Rise to wealth and influence
In August 1614, the then twenty-one-year-old George Villiers became the favourite of King James I of England, and remained in this position until the king's death in 1625. Under James's patronage, Villers advanced rapidly through the ranks of the nobility. In 1615 he was knighted as a Gentleman of the Bedchamber, and in 1616 elevated to the peerage as Baron Whaddon and Viscount Villiers. He was made Earl of Buckingham in 1617, then Marquess of Buckingham in 1618, and eventually Earl of Coventry and Duke of Buckingham in 1623. Buckingham was the king's constant companion and closest advisor. Even after James I's death, Buckingham remained at the height of royal favour under Charles I, until he was assassinated in 1628. Buckingham was buried in Westminster Abbey, while his titles passed to his son George (1628–1687), upon whose death they became extinct.

Continuing influence
As a royal favourite during the reigns of James I and Charles I, Buckingham used his enormous political influence to prodigiously enrich his relatives and advance their social positions, which soured public opinion towards him. Under his influence, several members of his immediate family were made knights, baronets and peers. His half-brother Edward († 1626) was knighted in 1616, while his mother was created Countess of Buckingham in her own right in 1618 and his eldest half-brother William († 1629) was created a baronet in 1619. Two of Buckingham's other brothers were similarly honoured when John († 1658) was created Baron Villiers of Stoke and Viscount Purbeck in 1619, and Christopher († 1630) was created Baron Villiers of Daventry and Earl of Anglesey in 1623.

Sir Edward Villiers († 1626) married Barbara St John, daughter of Sir John St John († 1594) of Lydiard Tregoze, Wiltshire, by whom he had ten children. Villiers' wife was the niece of Oliver St John, who was created Viscount Grandison in 1623. Grandison had no issue, so the Duke of Buckingham arranged for his half-brother's sons to inherit that title. Sir Edward Villiers's eldest son, William († 1643), thus succeeded as second Viscount Grandison in 1630. He was the father of Barbara Villiers († 1709), one of the mistresses of King Charles II, by whom she had five children, and who was created Duchess of Cleveland in 1670.

Sir Edward Villiers's second and third sons, John († c.1661) and George († 1699), succeeded as 3rd and 4th Viscounts Grandison, while the fourth son, Sir Edward Villiers († 1689), was father of Edward Villiers († 1711), who was created both Baron Villiers and Viscount Villiers in 1691 as well as Earl of Jersey in 1697. The 1st Earl of Jersey's sister, Elizabeth Villiers († 1733), was the presumed mistress of King William III of England from 1680 until 1695. Thomas Villiers († 1786), the second son of the 2nd Earl of Jersey, was created Baron Hyde and Earl of Clarendon in 1776.

On the death of the 4th Viscount Grandison in 1699, the title passed to his grandson, the 5th Viscount. He was the son of Brigadier-General the Hon. Edward Villiers († 1693), eldest son of the 4th Viscount. In 1721 the 5th Viscount Grandison was created Earl Grandison. Upon his death in 1766, the earldom became extinct while the viscountcy passed to his second cousin William Villiers, 3rd Earl of Jersey, who became the 6th Viscount Grandison. In 1746 Elizabeth Mason, daughter of the 1st Earl Grandison, was created Viscountess Grandison, and in 1767 she was made Viscountess Villiers and Countess Grandison. All three titles became extinct on the death of the 2nd Earl Grandison in 1800.

Theresa Villiers (born 1968), a British Conservative Party politician and former Secretary of State for Northern Ireland, is a descendant of Edward Ernest Villiers (1806–1843), a son of George Villiers († 1827) and brother of George Villiers, 4th Earl of Clarendon.

Members of the family

Earls of Buckingham (1618)

Mary Villiers, Countess of Buckingham (1570–1632)

Villiers baronets (1619)

Sir William Villiers, 1st Baronet (–1629)
Sir George Villiers, 2nd Baronet (1620–1682)
Sir William Villiers, 3rd Baronet (1645–1712)

Viscounts Purbeck (1619)
 John Villiers, 1st Viscount Purbeck (c. 1591–1658)

Viscounts Grandison (1623)

Oliver St John, 1st Viscount Grandison (–1630)
William Villiers, 2nd Viscount Grandison (1614–1643)
John Villiers, 3rd Viscount Grandison (died )
George Villiers, 4th Viscount Grandison (–1699) 
John Villiers, 5th Viscount Grandison, 1st Earl Grandison (1692–1766), after whom the title passed to the 3rd Earl of Jersey
William Villiers, 6th Viscount Grandison, 3rd Earl of Jersey (died 1769), after which the title remained merged with that of Earl of Jersey

Earls of Anglesey (1623)

Christopher Villiers, 1st Earl of Anglesey (d. 1630)
 Charles Villiers, 2nd Earl of Anglesey (d. 1661)

Dukes of Buckingham (1623)

George Villiers, 1st Duke of Buckingham (1592–1628)
George Villiers, 2nd Duke of Buckingham (1628–1687)

Dukes of Cleveland (1670)

Barbara Villiers, 1st Duchess of Cleveland (1641–1709)
Charles FitzRoy, 2nd Duke of Cleveland (1662–1730)
William FitzRoy, 3rd Duke of Cleveland (1698–1774)

Earls of Jersey (1697)

Edward Villiers, 1st Earl of Jersey (1656–1711)
William Villiers, 2nd Earl of Jersey (d. 1721)
William Villiers, 3rd Earl of Jersey (d. 1769)
George Bussy Villiers, 4th Earl of Jersey (1735–1805)
George Child Villiers, 5th Earl of Jersey (1773–1859)
George Augustus Frederick Child Villiers, 6th Earl of Jersey (1808–1859)
Victor Albert George Child Villiers, 7th Earl of Jersey (1845–1915)
George Henry Robert Child Villiers, 8th Earl of Jersey (1873–1923)
George Francis Child Villiers, 9th Earl of Jersey (1910–1998)
(George Francis) William Child Villiers, 10th Earl of Jersey (b. 1976)

Earls Grandison (1746)

Elizabeth Mason, 1st Countess Grandison (died 1782)
George Mason-Villiers, 2nd Earl Grandison (1751–1800)

Earls of Clarendon (1776)

 Thomas Villiers, 1st Earl of Clarendon (1709–1786)
 Thomas Villiers, 2nd Earl of Clarendon (1753–1824)
 John Charles Villiers, 3rd Earl of Clarendon (1757–1838)
 George William Frederick Villiers, 4th Earl of Clarendon (1800–1870)
 Edward Hyde Villiers, 5th Earl of Clarendon (1846–1914)
 George Herbert Hyde Villiers, 6th Earl of Clarendon (1877–1955)
 George Frederick Laurence Hyde Villiers, 7th Earl of Clarendon (1933–2009)
 George Edward Laurence Villiers, 8th Earl of Clarendon (b. 1976)

Notable marriages

 Edith Villiers became Countess Lytton and the Vicereine of India. 
 George Villiers, 1st Duke of Buckingham († 1628), son of Sir George Villiers († 1606), married in 1620, against her father's objections, Lady Katherine Manners, later suo jure Baroness de Ros, daughter of the 6th Earl of Rutland.
 Elizabeth Villiers († 1654), daughter of Sir George Villiers († 1606), married John Boteler, 1st Baron Boteler of Brantfield.
 Anne Villiers († 1588), daughter of Sir George Villiers († 1606), married Sir William Washington (1590-1648), brother of Lawrence Washington, great-great-grandfather of George Washington.
 John Villiers, 1st Viscount Purbeck († 1658), son of Sir George Villiers († 1606), married Frances Coke, daughter of Sir Edward Coke by his second wife, Elizabeth Cecil, daughter of Thomas Cecil, 1st Earl of Exeter.
 Susan Villiers († 1652), daughter of Sir George Villiers († 1606), married William Feilding, 1st Earl of Denbigh, parents-in-law to James Hamilton, 1st Duke of Hamilton.
 William Villiers, 2nd Viscount Grandison († 1643), married Mary Bayning, daughter and heiress of Paul Bayning, 1st Viscount Bayning.
 Barbara Villiers, Duchess of Cleveland († 1709), daughter of William Villiers, 2nd Viscount Grandison, married in 1659, against his family's wishes, Roger Palmer, 1st Earl of Castlemaine.
 Elizabeth Villiers († 1733), daughter of Sir Edward Villiers († 1689), married in 1695 George Hamilton, 1st Earl of Orkney.
 George Villiers, 4th Earl of Clarendon († 1870) married Lady Katherine Foster-Barham, daughter of James Grimston, 1st Earl of Verulam.
 Constance Villiers († 1922), daughter of George Villiers, 4th Earl of Clarendon, married Frederick Stanley, 16th Earl of Derby.
 Alice Villiers († 1897), daughter of George Villiers, 4th Earl of Clarendon, married Edward Bootle-Wilbraham, 1st Earl of Lathom.
 Emily Theresa Villiers († 1927), daughter of George Villiers, 4th Earl of Clarendon, married Odo Russell, 1st Baron Ampthill.
 Henry Montagu Villiers († 1908), son of Henry Montagu Villiers, married firstly Victoria Russell, daughter of John Russell, 1st Earl Russell, and secondly Charlotte Louisa Emily Cadogan, granddaughter of both George Cadogan, 3rd Earl Cadogan and Henry Paget, 1st Marquess of Anglesey.
 Gertrude Villiers († 1906), daughter of Henry Montagu Villiers, married Berkeley Paget, a great-grandson of Henry Bayly Paget, 1st Earl of Uxbridge.

Other notable members

 Edward Villiers († 1693), eldest son of George Villiers, 4th Viscount Grandison and his wife Mary, daughter of Francis Leigh, 1st Earl of Chichester. In 1677, he married the heiress Katherine FitzGerald, through whom he gained substantial property in County Waterford. He adopted the surname FitzGerald-Villiers to reflect this inheritance. Their children included John, later 5th Viscount and 1st Earl Grandison, and Harriet, who married Robert Pitt and was the mother of William Pitt, 1st Earl of Chatham.
 George Villiers († 1827), politician. He was the third son of Thomas Villiers, 1st Earl of Clarendon.
 Thomas Hyde Villiers († 1832), politician. He was a son of George Villiers († 1827).
 Henry Montagu Villiers († 1861), Bishop of Carlisle in 1856 and Bishop of Durham from 1860 to 1861. He was a son of George Villiers († 1827).
 Charles Pelham Villiers († 1898) politician. He was a son of George Villiers († 1827).
 James Villiers (1933–1998), actor. The grandson of Sir Francis Hyde Villiers and great-grandson of George Villiers, 4th Earl of Clarendon; his mother was descended from Earl Talbot.
 Theresa Villiers (born 1968), politician, Secretary of State for Northern Ireland (2012–2016). She is a direct male-line descendant of George Villiers († 1827).
 Christopher Villiers (born 1960), actor. Descendant of Henry Montagu Villiers.

Members of the Order of the Garter 
Several members of the Villiers family have also been knights of the Order of the Garter. The following is a list is of all Villiers members of this order, across all branches of the family, along with their year of investiture.
 1616 – George Villiers, 1st Duke of Buckingham 
 1649 – George Villiers, 2nd Duke of Buckingham  
 1849 – George Villiers, 4th Earl of Clarendon
 1937 – George Villiers, 6th Earl of Clarendon

References

 
Noble families of the United Kingdom